The Manjung District, formerly Dindings, is a district in the southwestern part of the state of Perak, Malaysia. It is administered by the Manjung Municipal Council, formerly known as Manjung District Council from 1 January 1980 until 31 July 2001. The district is well known for Pangkor Island, an attraction in Perak and the home of the Royal Malaysian Navy (TLDM), Lumut Naval Base and dockyard. Dinding was once part of the British Straits Settlements colony. Seri Manjung is the district's principal urban centre while smaller towns include Lumut town, Sitiawan town, Ayer Tawar, Pantai Remis and Beruas.

History

Prior to 1973 the district was called Dindings. It used to be part of the Straits Settlements, then under the administration of Penang. Dindings district became part of the Pangkor Treaty signed by Britain, and the British appointed Sultan of Perak Sultan Abdullah, in January 1874. This agreement was signed to stop the bloodshed resulting from two major events, the struggle for the throne between relatives of Perak royalty on the death of Sultan Ali, and Chinese clan wars between Ghee Hin and Hai San to grab tin mining areas in late colonial Taiping. 

The agreement required the Sultan of Perak to surrender Dindings to the British, to accept a British Resident, James W. W. Birch, and the appointment of an assistant resident in Taiping, Captain Tristram Speedy. Sultan Ismail was to step down from the throne of Perak.

During the British colonial era, colonial Dindings comprised three main areas: Sitiawan, Lumut and Pangkor Island.

The British had hoped that Dindings would prove to be a valuable natural harbour. However, this did not become the case. In 1935, the Sultan of Perak, Sultan Iskandar Alang successfully appealed to the British for the return of Dindings to Perak. The Perak government united the former colony with Bruas and coastal areas to the south, forming the Dindings district. In 1973, Dindings district was given its current name, Manjung.

On 24 April 2009, Lumut was declared by the Sultan Perak as the Royal Malaysian Navy's Town – or simply called as TLDM Town or Navy Town. Manjung also was declared as "Bandar Pelancongan Dan Maritim" (Tourism and Maritime Town) by government of Perak.

In August 2016, Sembilan Island was separated from Manjung District and incorporated into Bagan Datuk District.

Administrative divisions

Manjung District is divided into five mukims:
Beruas
Lekir
Lumut
Pengkalan Baharu
Sitiawan

Federal Parliament and State Assembly Seats 
Manjung district is divided to two parliamentary constituencies with the northern part of district is under Beruas constituency while southern part is part of Lumut constituency. As of 2022, there were 201,345 voters in both the parliament seats combined.

Voter Demographics 
List of Manjung district representatives in the Federal Parliament (Dewan Rakyat)

List of Manjung district representatives in the State Legislative Assembly of Perak

Demographics 

The following is based on Department of Statistics Malaysia 2020 census.

Education 
Manjung has numerous schools, with 24 Chinese primary schools and five Chinese secondary schools in the district. Of these, five schools were founded by Ong Seok Kim. They are SJK (C) Chung Cheng, Sitiawan in 1920; SMJK Nan Hwa (which split into Sekolah Tinggi Nan Hwa, Ayer Tawar Road in 1984) in 1935; SJK (C) Ping Min, Lumut in 1951; and SMJK Dindings, Lumut in 1953. Ong Seok Kim died in 1964. The following year, the Manjung community established the Ong Seok Kim Memorial Education Fund in his honour. The fund offers scholarships and loans to students in the Manjung District, irrespective of ethnicity. All school are under the administration of district education office.

Secondary education
 City Harbour International School
SMK Seri Manjung
SMK Kampung Dato’ Seri Kamaruddin
SMK Ahmad Boestamam
SMK Convent, Sitiawan
SMK Methodist (ACS), Sitiawan
SMK Tok Perdana
SMK Ambrose
SMK Methodist, Ayer Tawar
SMK Raja Shahriman
SMK Pantai Remis
SMK Changkat Beruas
SMK Dato' Idris, Pengkalan Bharu
SMK Seri Samudera
SMK Batu Sepuluh, Lekir
SMK Pangkalan TLDM
SMK Pangkor
Kolej Vokasional Seri Manjung

Tertiary education
 Universiti Kuala Lumpur Malaysian Institute of Marine Engineering Technology (UniKL MIMET)
 Institut Kemahiran Mara (IKM) (Lumut)
 Kolej Komuniti (located partly in Sekolah Teknik Seri Manjung)
 Kolej Kejururawatan Ipoh (Lumut branch – located near in Lumut Town)

Training centres
 Outward Bound Malaysia, Lumut
 Pusat Latihan Khidmat Negara, (Teluk Rubiah & Segari)

Transport
The public transportation servicing the Manjung area are public buses in the Seri Manjung and Lumut bus stations.

Manjung district is accessible via Route 5, Route 60, Ipoh-Lumut Highway and West Coast Expressway.

There are two small airfields located in Sitiawan and Pangkor but both of them are unused.

Healthcare
The main public healthcare centre serving Manjung is Hospital Seri Manjung, Hospital Angkatan Tentera in Lumut. Besides this, there are numerous clinics in the surrounding region such as in Sitiawan, Ayer Tawar, Pulau Pangkor, Pantai Remis, Beruas, Lekir. A new hospital opened in 2014, Pantai Hospital Seri Manjung. There is also KPJ Manjung. 

Columbia Asia Hospital in Sitiawan will replace the earlier proposed Goodhope Specialist Hospital, Sitiawan which was abandoned in January 2014. This project was then abandoned.

Economy 

The major economic sectors in Manjung are agriculture, manufacturing and the services industries. Agriculture is the main economic sector, making up the majority of the population's employment. Manjung is well known for its livestock production, especially poultry. Sea fishing and fish/prawn farming are the most important economic activities for some community members. At least 5,000 residents are fishermen. Farming of fresh-water fish and prawns are being carried out thoroughly in the district. There are more than 300 ponds of prawns in operation. The most popular prawn farming area is along Dinding River.

Manjung District has become the fastest growing district in the state of Perak. Property prices are seeing increases of over 15% in the past few years. In terms of growth of commercial sector, Manjung is the second fastest growing district in the state, with 5,947 developed units or 13.32%. Many of these businesses and industries are located along the roads connecting Sitiawan, Seri Manjung, Lumut and Ayer Tawar. Industrial and commercial activities are also present in other smaller, neighboring towns such as Beruas, Pantai Remis, Pekan Gurney, Lekir and Changkat Kuring.

Businesses in Manjung include wholesale, groceries and services. There are also informal activities such as settled hawkers (1,029 which cover 11.00%) and itinerant hawkers (1,092 which cover 11.00%) in Manjung district.

Of all the business activities here, services contribute about 72.30% of all the commercial activities. The groceries sector is the second largest commercial activity, covering 24.40% (1,449 unit), while wholesale activities cover the remaining portion, with about 3.40%.

Tourism

Pangkor 

Pangkor Island, a holiday resort, is one of the most well known islands in Malaysia. It is located approximately 90 km southwest of Ipoh. The main tourist drawer to Pangkor Island are beaches on the western coastline, such as Pantai Puteri Dewi, Pasir Bogak Beach, Teluk Belanga, Teluk Segadas, Teluk Nipah, and Teluk Cempedak.

The main island of Pangkor is populated mainly by fisherfolk who occupy the eastern coastline. The island is known for its anchovies and squid.

There are also ruins of a 330-year-old Dutch Fort located in Teluk Gadong which was one of the Dutch strongholds against pirates and local Malays. Another historical interest on Pangkor Island is the Pangkor Stone Tablet (Batu Bersurat Pangkor in Malay) which is near the Dutch fort.

Pangkor Laut Island, a small privately owned island to the southwest of the main island, is the second largest of the nine islands that make up the Pangkor archipelago. Pangkor Laut is known for its white beaches and clear waters. It has three main beaches, Emerald Bay, Coral Beach and Royal Bay.

Marina Island 

Marina Island is one of the man-made island in Malaysia, built on the coast of Teluk Muruh, opposite Pangkor Island and Pangkor Laut Resort, in the state of Perak, Malaysia. Marina Island took five years of planning and feasibility studies to ensure that the making of the island would not disrupt the environment.

Marina Island is also a gateway to Pangkor Island with the establishment of a domestic jetty terminal in the island. The journey to Pangkor Island takes 10 minutes from the Marina Island Jetty.

Beaches 

Aside from beaches on Pangkor Island, there are other beaches in Manjung that are popular among locals and tourists. Teluk Batik is often a choice for campers, picnickers and swimmers. Other nearby beaches include Pasir Panjang, Tanjung Kepah and Teluk Senangin.

Other places of interest 
The Terrapin Breeding Centre is a breeding and information centre for terrapins (or Batagur baska).

There are two museums in the district, namely Beruas Museum and Sitiawan Settlement Museum.

Golf courses 

Golf courses in Manjung include Damai Laut Golf and Country Club.

Shopping Centres 

 Billion Shopping Centre, Jalan Lumut, Seri Manjung
 The Store, Sitiawan (formerly Fajar Supermarket)
 Ikhwan Supermarket, Seri Manjung (formerly Rapid and Ceria Supermarket).
 Econsave Hypermarket, Sitiawan
 Lotus's Hypermarket, Seri Manjung
 AEON Mall Seri Manjung
 Mydin Hypermarket, Sri Manjung (proposed) – beside Toyota Showroom
 TF Value, Seri Manjung. (both in Taman Samudera and Manjung Point).

Sport attractions
 Manjung stadium
 Padang Astaka Sitiawan
 MP3 Badminton Court Centre
 Manjung Indoor Sport Arena (MISA)
 Manjung Badminton Arena Lekir

See also

 Districts of Malaysia

References

External links
Rancangan Tempatan Daerah Perak Tengah 2030